The 1999 Maryland Terrapins football team represented the University of Maryland in the 1999 NCAA Division I-A football season. In their third season under head coach Ron Vanderlinden, the Terrapins compiled a 5–6 record, finished in eighth place in the Atlantic Coast Conference, and outscored their opponents 292 to 260. The team's statistical leaders included Calvin McCall with 1,264 passing yards, LaMont Jordan with 1,632 rushing yards, and Jermaine Arrington with 302 receiving yards.

Schedule

Roster

References

Maryland
Maryland Terrapins football seasons
Maryland Terrapins football